Harold Edward Brooks (born March 11, 1959) is an American meteorologist whose research is concentrated on severe convective storms and tornadoes, particularly severe weather climatology, as well as weather forecasting.

Life and work 

Brooks began his higher education career at William Jewell College, studying physics and mathematics, achieving a B.A., summa cum laude, in 1982. While there he studied abroad at the University of Cambridge, passing Part 1 of the tripos in Archaeology and Anthropology in 1980. In 1985 he earned a M.A. and M.Phil. at Columbia University from the Atmospheric Sciences Program within the Department of Geological Sciences. This was followed by doctoral studies at the University of Illinois at Urbana-Champaign, culminating in a Ph.D. in atmospheric sciences in 1990. During this period Brooks worked as a laboratory assistant, graduate assistant, rapporteur, and graduate research assistant. Brooks is a member of Sigma Xi.

Brooks joined the National Severe Storms Laboratory (NSSL) as a research meteorologist in 1991. Elected as a Fellow of the American Meteorological Society (AMS) in 2010 and a Fellow of the Royal Meteorological Society (RMetS) in 1996, Brooks has received the Department of Commerce Silver Medal in 2002, three NOAA Research Outstanding Paper Awards, and the NOAA Administrator's Award in 2007. He was a contributor to the Physical Science Basis portion of the Fourth Assessment Report of the IPCC, an organization that was co-awarded the 2007 Nobel Peace Prize.

References

External links 
 NSSL homepage
 

American meteorologists
American climatologists
Alumni of the University of Cambridge
William Jewell College alumni
Columbia University alumni
University of Illinois Urbana-Champaign alumni
University of Oklahoma faculty
Storm chasers
1959 births
Living people
National Weather Service people
Fellows of the American Meteorological Society